Flip-flops are a simple type of footwear in which there is a band between the big toe and the other toes.

Flip-flop may also refer to:

Entertainment
 Flip-Flop (album), a 1989 album by Guadalcanal Diary
 Flip-Flop (audio drama), a 2003 audio drama based on the British television series Doctor Who
 "Flip-Flop" (Will & Grace), an episode of the television series Will & Grace

 Flip Flop (Modern Family), an episode of the television series Modern Family
 Flip Flop (The Price Is Right), a game on The Price Is Right
 "Flip Flop", a song by Megan Thee Stallion from the album Traumazine, 2022

 Flip and Flop, a 1983 video game
 Flip or Flop, a U.S. television series on HGTV

Computers and electronics
 Flip-flop (electronics), a circuit with two stable states
 Flip-flop (programming), a boolean expression with persistent state and two conditions

Sports
 A back handspring (gymnastics)
 A trick performed in the sport of freestyle kayaking (Playboating)

Other uses
 Flip (mathematics), and flop – operations in algebraic geometry
 Flip-flop (politics), a sudden change of position on an issue
 Flip-flop hub, a type of hub used in bicycle wheels
 Flip-flop kinetics, a phenomenon in pharmacokinetics when a drug is released at a sustained rate instead of immediate release
 A common name of the African wood white butterfly (Leptosia alcesta)
 Flip flop, per top, bottom and versatile, a role reversal between two men during a single sexual encounter
 The translocation of a phospholipid in cell membranes carried out by flippase proteins

See also
 Flippity and Flop, a pair of cartoon characters that appeared in theatrical shorts, 1945–1947
 Flip (disambiguation)
 Flop (disambiguation)